Paraxanthias is a genus of crabs in the family Xanthidae, containing one exclusively fossil species and the following extant species:

 Paraxanthias elegans (Stimpson, 1858)
 Paraxanthias eriphioides (A. Milne-Edwards, 1867)
 Paraxanthias flavescens (Rathbun, 1906)
 Paraxanthias insculptus (Stimpson, 1871)
 Paraxanthias notatus (Dana, 1852)
 Paraxanthias pachydactylus (A. Milne-Edwards, 1867)
 Paraxanthias parvus (Borradaile, 1900)
 Paraxanthias sulcatus (Faxon, 1893)
 Paraxanthias taylori (Stimpson, 1861)

References

Xanthoidea